Salvatore Phillip "Sonny" Bono (February 16, 1935 – January 5, 1998) was an American singer, songwriter, actor, and politician who came to fame in partnership with his second wife Cher as the popular singing duo Sonny & Cher. A member of the Republican Party, Bono served as the 16th mayor of Palm Springs, California, from 1988 to 1992, and served as the U.S. representative for California's 44th district from 1995 until his death in 1998.

The United States Copyright Term Extension Act of 1998, which extended the term of copyright by 20 years, was named in honor of Bono when it was passed by Congress nine months after his death. Mary Bono (his widow) had been one of the original sponsors of the legislation, commonly known as the Sonny Bono Copyright Term Extension Act.

Early life 
Bono was born in Detroit, the son of Zena "Jean" (née DiMercurio) and Santo Bono. His father was born in Montelepre, Palermo, Italy, and his mother was also of Italian descent. His mother called him "Sono" as a term of endearment, which evolved over time into "Sonny".  Sonny was the youngest of three siblings; he had two sisters, Fran and Betty.  The family moved to Inglewood, California, when he was seven, and his parents divorced soon afterwards.  Bono decided early in life to become part of the music business, and began writing songs as a teenager.  "Koko Joe", a song he wrote at age 16, was recorded by Don and Dewey in 1958, and later covered by several other artists including The Righteous Brothers.  Bono attended Inglewood High School, but did not graduate, opting to drop out so he could begin to pursue a career as a songwriter and performer. He worked at a variety of jobs while trying to break into the music business, including waiter, truck driver, construction laborer, and butcher's helper.

Career

Entertainment career 

Bono began his music career as a songwriter at Specialty Records, where his song "Things You Do to Me" was recorded by Sam Cooke, and went on to work for record producer Phil Spector in the early 1960s as a promotion man, percussionist and "gofer". One of his earliest songwriting efforts, "Needles and Pins" was co-written with Jack Nitzsche, another member of Spector's production team. In 1965, he achieved commercial success with his wife Cher in the singing duo Sonny & Cher. Bono wrote, arranged and produced a number of hit records including the singles "I Got You Babe" and "The Beat Goes On", although Cher received more attention as a performer. He played a major part in Cher's early solo recording career, writing and producing singles including "Bang Bang" and "You Better Sit Down Kids".

Under a pseudonym, Bono co-wrote "She Said Yeah", covered by The Rolling Stones on their 1965 LP December's Children. His lone hit single as a solo artist, "Laugh at Me", was released in 1965 and peaked at No. 10 on the Billboard Hot 100. In live concerts, Bono introduced the song by saying "I'd like to sing a medley of my hit". His only other single as a solo artist, "The Revolution Kind", reached No. 70 on the Billboard Hot 100 later that year. His solo album, Inner Views, was released in 1967.

Sonny continued to work with Cher through the early and mid-1970s, starring in a popular television variety show, The Sonny & Cher Comedy Hour, which ran on CBS from 1971 to 1974. In 1974 his solo variety show, The Sonny Comedy Revue, which ran on ABC for one season. From 1976 to 1977, the duo, since divorced, returned to perform together on The Sonny and Cher Show. Their last appearance together was on Late Night with David Letterman on November 13, 1987, on which they sang "I Got You Babe".

In 2011, Sonny Bono was inducted into the Michigan Rock and Roll Legends Hall of Fame.

Film and television 
Bono's acting career included bit parts as a guest performer in such television series as The Man From UNCLE, (appearing with Cher in 'The Hot Number Affair) Fantasy Island, Charlie's Angels, The Love Boat, The Six Million Dollar Man and CHiPs. In the 1975 TV movie Murder on Flight 502, he played the role of rock star Jack Marshall. He appeared in the 1980 miniseries Top of the Hill. He played the role of mad bomber Joe Selucci in Airplane II: The Sequel (1982) and appeared in the horror film Troll (1986). He also portrayed racist entrepreneur Franklin von Tussle in the John Waters film Hairspray (1988). In Men in Black (1997), Bono is one of several oddball celebrities seen on a wall of video screens that monitor extraterrestrials living among us. He also appeared as the Mayor of Palm Springs (which he actually was at the time) in several episodes of P.S. I Luv U during the 1991–92 TV season, and on Lois & Clark: The New Adventures of Superman (in season 1, episode 9  "The Man of Steel Bars", which aired November 21, 1993), in which he played Mayor Frank Berkowitz. He also made a minor appearance as himself in the comedy film First Kid (1996).

Bono guest-starred as himself on The Golden Girls episode "Mrs. George Devereaux" (originally broadcast November 17, 1990), in which he vied with Lyle Waggoner for Dorothy's (Bea Arthur) affection in a dream sequence. In Blanche's (Rue McClanahan) dream, her husband is still alive, and Bono uses his power as Mayor of Palm Springs to have Waggoner falsely arrested so he can have Dorothy to himself. Sophia (Estelle Getty) had been hoping for Sonny and Dorothy to get together and actively supported Sonny.

 Political career 

Bono entered politics after experiencing great frustration with local government bureaucracy in trying to open a restaurant in Palm Springs, California. Bono made a successful bid to become the new mayor of Palm Springs. He served four years, from 1988 to 1992. He was instrumental in spearheading the creation of the Palm Springs International Film Festival, which is held each year in Bono's memory.

Bono ran for the Republican nomination for United States Senate in 1992, but the nomination went to the more conservative Bruce Herschensohn, and the election to the Democrat Barbara Boxer. Bono and Herschensohn became close friends after the campaign. Bono was elected to the United States House of Representatives in 1994 to represent California's 44th congressional district. He was one of twelve co-sponsors of a House bill extending copyright. Although that bill was never voted on in the Senate, a similar Senate bill was passed after his death and named the Sonny Bono Copyright Term Extension Act in his memory. It is also known (derisively) as the Mickey Mouse Protection Act.

He championed the restoration of the Salton Sea, bringing the giant lake's plight to national attention. In 1998, then Speaker of the House Newt Gingrich made a public appearance and speech at the shore of the lake on Bono's behalf.

In their book Tell Newt to Shut Up, David Maraniss and Michael Weisskopf credit Bono with being the first person to recognize Gingrich's public relations problems in 1995. Drawing on his long experience as a celebrity and entertainment producer, Bono (according to Maraniss and Weisskopf) recognized that Gingrich's status had changed from politician to celebrity and that he was not making allowances for that change:

Bono remains the only member of Congress to have scored a number-one pop single on the US Billboard Hot 100 chart.

 Personal life 
 Marriages 
Bono was married four times. He married his first wife, Donna Rankin, on November 3, 1954. Their daughter Christine ("Christy") was born on June 24, 1958. They divorced in 1962.

In 1964, Bono married Cherilyn Sarkisian, later known as singer and actress Cher. The couple had one child, Chaz, born March 4, 1969. The couple divorced in 1975.

Bono married actress-model Susie Coelho on New Year's Eve 1981; they divorced in 1984.

He wed Mary Whitaker in 1986 and they had two children, son Chesare Elan in 1988 and daughter Chianna Maria in 1991.

 Godparent 
Bono was named a godparent of Anthony Kiedis, who became a musical artist with his band, Red Hot Chili Peppers. Sonny was a close friend of Kiedis's father, Blackie Dammett, and often took young Kiedis on weekend trips.

 Salton Sea 
Bono was a champion of the Salton Sea in southeastern California, where a park was named in his honor. The 2005 documentary film Plagues & Pleasures on the Salton Sea (narrated by John Waters) features Bono and documented the lives of the inhabitants of Bombay Beach, Niland and Salton City, as well as the ecological issues associated with the Sea.

 Religion 
He became interested in Scientology and took Scientology courses partly because of the influence of Mimi Rogers, but stated that he was a Roman Catholic on all official documents, campaign materials and websites. His wife Mary also took Scientology courses. However, after his death, Mary Bono stated that "Sonny did try to break away [from the Church of Scientology] at one point, and they made it very difficult for him." The Church of Scientology said there was no estrangement from Bono.

 Death 

Bono died on January 5, 1998, of injuries incurred when he hit a tree while skiing at Heavenly Mountain Resort in South Lake Tahoe, California.

At Mary's request, Cher gave a eulogy at Sonny's funeral. He was buried at Desert Memorial Park in Cathedral City, California. The epitaph on Bono's headstone reads "AND THE BEAT GOES ON".

Mary Bono was elected to fill the remainder of her husband's congressional term. She was elected in her own right seven subsequent times before being defeated in the election of 2012.

 Honors and tributes 

Sonny Bono has been honored and memorialized with:

 A Golden Palm Star on the Palm Springs Walk of Stars: dedicated to him in 1996.
 Sonny Bono Copyright Term Extension Act: Extended copyright protections effective October 27, 1998.
 Sonny Bono Salton Sea National Wildlife Refuge: a nature reserve on the Salton Sea was renamed in Bono's honor in 1998.
 Sonny Bono Memorial Park, a small park in Washington, D.C., was named in his honor in 1998.
 Sonny Bono Memorial Interchange: an interchange on California State Route 60 at Nason Street in Moreno Valley, California, was named for Bono in September 2000.
 Sony Bono Memorial Freeway: a 40-mile stretch of Interstate 10 near Palm Springs was dedicated January 10, 2002.
 Sonny Bono Concourse: a concourse at Palm Springs International Airport dedicated October 22, 2002.
 Sonny Bono  Memorial Fountain and Statue''': Located in downtown Palm Springs, California, the statue was dedicated in November 2002.

 See also 

 List of actor–politicians
 List of famous skiing deaths
 List of United States Congress members who died in office (1950–99)

 References 

 Further reading 
 Sonny Bono: And the Beat Goes On. New York: Pocket Books 1991. 
 Joel Whitburn's Top Pop Singles, 12th edition. Menomonee Falls, WI: Record Research, 2009. .
 Bono vs. Bono: A Battle Royal '', Bobby Soxers, 2013. .

External links 

 
 
 
 
 
 FBI Records: The Vault – Salvatore Phillip "Sonny" Bono at vault.fbi.gov
 S.505: Sonny Bono Copyright Term Extension Act
 

 
1935 births
1998 deaths
American actor-politicians
American male film actors
American male singer-songwriters
American people of Italian descent
Record producers from California
American Scientologists
American male television actors
Burials at Desert Memorial Park
Mayors of Palm Springs, California
Male actors from Detroit
Skiing deaths
Specialty Records artists
Sports deaths in California
Sonny & Cher
20th-century American male actors
Musicians from Inglewood, California
Male actors from Palm Springs, California
Atco Records artists
Republican Party members of the United States House of Representatives from California
20th-century American singers
20th-century American politicians
The Wrecking Crew (music) members
Catholics from California
20th-century American male singers
Singer-songwriters from California